Alfeu is a given name. Notable people with the name include:

Alfeu Adolfo Monjardim de Andrade e Almeida (1836–1924), Brazilian governor
Alfeu (footballer) (born 1936), Brazilian footballer

See also

Portuguese masculine given names